Jurica 'Juri' Siljanoski (born 30 December 1973 in Yugoslavia) is a Macedonian retired professional footballer.

Club career
After five years of no games at clubs like FK Ohrid, Bayern Munich, AZ Alkmaar and Vardar Skopje, Juri transferred to ADO Den Haag in the Dutch Eerste Divisie. He moved to Slovenia and then Belgium for three different teams over three years to gain more match time.

From 2001 to 2003, he played three years at Elfsborg in Sweden playing and scoring in the UEFA Champions League Qualifying Rounds. He then moved to Romania to play in the second division for two years.

He married an Australian woman and moved to Australia where he first trialled for A-League club Queensland Roar. He then joined Fawkner Blues in the Victorian Premier League followed by Altona Magic. After being released from Altona Magic, he joined next door neighbouring club Altona East Phoenix where he played the remainder of season 2007 in Victorian State Division 2 N/W. He then joined Phoenix rivals Brunswick City in the same division in 2008.

International career
He made his senior debut for Macedonia in a November 2001 friendly match against Hungary and has earned a total of 5 caps, scoring 1 goal. His final international was a January 2002 friendly against Finland.

Honours
Maribor
Slovenian First League: 1997–98
Elfsborg
Svenska Cupen: 2001, 2003

References

External links

1973 births
Living people
Sportspeople from Ohrid
Association football forwards
Macedonian footballers
North Macedonia international footballers
FK Ohrid players
AZ Alkmaar players
FC Bayern Munich II players
FK Vardar players
ADO Den Haag players
NK Maribor players
K.V.C. Westerlo players
K.V. Kortrijk players
Cercle Brugge K.S.V. players
IF Elfsborg players
FC Bihor Oradea players
Altona Magic SC players
Altona East Phoenix players
Macedonian Second Football League players
Macedonian First Football League players
Eerste Divisie players
Slovenian PrvaLiga players
Belgian Pro League players
Challenger Pro League players
Allsvenskan players
Liga I players
Liga II players
Macedonian expatriate footballers
Expatriate footballers in the Netherlands
Macedonian expatriate sportspeople in the Netherlands
Expatriate footballers in Germany
Macedonian expatriate sportspeople in Germany
Expatriate footballers in Slovenia
Macedonian expatriate sportspeople in Slovenia
Expatriate footballers in Belgium
Macedonian expatriate sportspeople in Belgium
Expatriate footballers in Sweden
Macedonian expatriate sportspeople in Sweden
Expatriate footballers in Romania
Macedonian expatriate sportspeople in Romania
Expatriate soccer players in Australia
Macedonian expatriate sportspeople in Australia